Knott's may refer to:
Knott's Berry Farm, a theme park in Buena Park, California, now owned by Cedar Fair
 Knott's Berry Farm, brand name of food specialty products (jams and preserves) manufacturer, now part of The J. M. Smucker Company based in Placentia, California
 Knott's Camp Snoopy, the former name of Camp Snoopy (now Nickelodeon Universe), a theme park in the Mall of America, previously owned by Cedar Fair
 Knott's Soak City, a seasonal water park in Buena Park, California

See also 
 Knott (disambiguation)
 Knotts